In 2016, a total of 7,349 fires had burned an area  in California, according to the California Department of Forestry and Fire Protection.

Climatologists had predicted an extreme version of El Niño, known as a Super El Niño, to occur during the winter of 2015–16. Although the Pacific Ocean’s warming water had been expected to bring strong storms to parts of the southwestern United States, actual precipitation totals generally underperformed those expectations. Early in 2016, The National Interagency Fire Center predicted that conditions from May through at least August would put much of the western United States in above-normal wildfire danger.

Events

In June, the United States Forest Service estimated that over 26 million trees had died across  in the Sierra Nevada Mountains. This brought the number of dead trees to over 66 million during the past four years of drought.

On August 15, the National Interagency Fire Center showed the state leading the nation in the quantity, size and intensity of wildfires. A day later, on August 16, San Bernardino County announced that nearly 85,000 people were evacuated because of the Blue Cut Fire near Cajon Pass. Authorities arrested a 40-year-old man in connection to the Clayton Fire, and charged him with 17 counts of arson.

Fires 
Below is a list of all fires that exceeded  during the 2016 California wildfire season, as well as the fires that caused significant damage. The information is taken from CAL FIRE's list of large fires, and other sources where indicated.

4S Ranch brush fire

On Thursday, May 5, 2016, shortly before 3 P.M. PDT, a small brush fire ignited off the 15000 block of Dove Creek Road, in a creek bed, in 4S Ranch, San Diego County. As the fire began spreading eastward, students and staff at the nearby Oak Valley Middle School were ordered to stay indoors, though parents were allowed to pick up their children. However, as the fire continued to spread, evacuation orders were issued for some homes along Palomino Valley Road and Oak Valley Middle School, with the students from Oak Valley Middle School being relocated by bus to Westview High School. The sudden change caused some confusion and chaos among parents attempting to pick up their children, and drew criticism towards the last-minute evacuation plan. At 4:34 PM PDT, the evacuation orders for the homes on Palomino Valley Road were lifted, as the fire was brought to 90% containment. Just before 5:30 PM PDT, the brush fire was fully extinguished, and Rancho Santa Fe fire officials declared 100% containment of the fire. The fire did not cause any injuries or structural damage. The brush fire was determined to have been accidentally caused by sparks coming from a welder.

See also
 List of California wildfires
 2005 Labor Day brush fire
 2016 Fort McMurray Wildfire
 2014 California wildfires
 May 2014 San Diego County wildfires

References

External links

 California current incident information from CAL FIRE  
 California wildfires on the US Forestry Incident Information System  (InciWeb)
 2016 California Fire Map (Calfire/Google Maps)

 
California, 2016
Wildfires in California by year